The 15th Prix Jutra ceremony was held on March 17, 2013 at the Salle Pierre-Mercure theatre in Montreal, Quebec, to honour achievements in the Cinema of Quebec in 2012.

Winners and nominees

References

Prix Iris
2012 in Canadian cinema
2013 in Quebec
15